Cdr.  (born in 1890 - died 2 May 1943) was a Japanese naval officer, commander of the Yokosuka 6th SNLF (from No.6 Base Force, in Kwajalein).

He was in command during the Japanese occupation of the Gilbert Islands in Betio, Tarawa, from September 1942 to 22 February 1943, after the US Raid on Makin Island. Because of the distance between Kwajalein and Tarawa (580 nautical miles), on 15 February 1943, the Gilbert Islands, Ocean Island, and Nauru were removed from the 6th Base Force in Kwajalein. They were replaced under a new 3rd Special Base Force with headquarters in Betio, and Admiral  replaced Matsuo. Following the loss of his command, Matsuo performed seppuku on 2 May 1943.

Reference 

1890 births
1943 deaths
Suicides by seppuku
Battle of Tarawa
Imperial Japanese Navy officers
Imperial Japanese Navy personnel of World War II
Japanese military personnel who committed suicide